Steve Maguiness (born 27 January 1959) is a New Zealand cricketer. He played in 43 first-class and 40 List A matches for Wellington from 1981 to 1988.

See also
 List of Wellington representative cricketers

References

External links
 

1959 births
Living people
New Zealand cricketers
Wellington cricketers
Cricketers from Palmerston North